Antonio Locatelli (19 April 1895 – 27 June 1936) was a pioneering Italian aviator and National Fascist Party legislator. He served in Gabriele d'Annunzio's air squadron during the war against Austria and was decorated. After the war he became a deputy to Parliament. In 1924 he attempted a transatlantic flight but was forced down into the seas off Greenland, whence he was rescued. He was killed during the Second Italo-Ethiopian War.

Early life
Locatelli was the son of Samuel Locatelli and Anna Gelfi, a family of modest financial standing in Bergamo, Italy.  From 1908 until his graduation in 1913, he attended the Bergamo Industrial Institute.  He was a keen mountaineer in his youth, climbing the Adamello, Trentino, with his brother Carlo. He then became chief technician at the Ansaldo di Cornigliano Ligure.

Aviator
Having joined a flying unit of the army, Locatelli was granted his pilot's licence in 1915.  He went on to fly 523 sorties during World War I, starting out in reconnaissance and then flying fighters and bombers.  He was particularly celebrated in performing solo reconnaissance over Zepellin yards in Friedrichshafen and flying over Vienna on 9 July 1918.  He was subsequently downed and captured by the Germans, spending some time at Sigmundsherberg POW camp.  In recognition of his valour, he received gold and silver medals and was made a knight of the Military Order of Savoy.

Attempted circumnavigation
Locatelli led Italy's attempt to achieve the first aerial circumnavigation during the 1924 scramble by six nations to achieve the feat.  Flying a metal hulled Dornier Do J Wal flying boat, powered by two Rolls-Royce engines and with a crew of three (Lt. Tullio Crosio, copilot, Lts. Giovanni Branni and Bruno Farcinelli, engineers), he left Pisa, Italy, on 25 July 1924, heading west.  Locatelli's attempt came to an end on 21 August when heavy fog forced a landing 120 miles short of Greenland.  Damage sustained to the plane's engine-carriers precluded resumption of the flight.  Four days earlier, he had met up with the American team led by Lowell Smith, who were to be ultimately successful in setting the record, in Reykjavik, and had intended to accompany them on the circumnavigation.  It was this chance meeting which ultimately saved their lives as the Americans raised the alarm when Locatelli failed to arrive in Greenland and the USS Richmond found them after a search by a flotilla of craft.

Memorials
The following were dedicated to the memory of Antonio Locatelli:
 Via Antonio Locatelli and the rationalist style fountain with aviator's bust, Bergamo
 the Bergamo Section Antonio Locatelli of the Italian Alpine Club
 Antonio Locatelli Primary School, Cavernago
 Antonio Locatelli Hut in Tre Cime di Lavaredo Natural Park

References

1895 births
1936 deaths
Aviation pioneers
Italian aviators
Italian male journalists
Italian military personnel
Knights of the Military Order of Savoy
Recipients of the Gold Medal of Military Valor
Recipients of the Silver Medal of Military Valor
20th-century Italian journalists
20th-century Italian male writers